Mok Kit-keung, also spelled as Mok Kit Keung, was a Hong Kong-born Chinese cook.

Biography
Mok Kit-keung was born in Hong Kong. He starting working at an early age and became a dishwasher at a restaurant, owned by his uncle, when he was aged 13. 

In 2017, he moved to Singapore and joined Shangri-La Singapore as head chef. Previously, he worked at Shang Palace and in 2012 due to his contributions, it received a Michelin star twice, last one in 2012. He also worked as a cook for Mohammed VI of Morocco and Vladimir Putin.

In 2021, he died at the age of 58.

Awards
 Restaurant Association of Singapore

References

1960s births
2021 deaths